The Detroit Film Critics Society Award for Best Supporting Actor is an annual award given by the Detroit Film Critics Society to honor the best supporting actor of that year.

Winners 

 † indicates the winner of the Academy Award for Best Supporting Actor.

2000s

2010s

2020s 
2020: Daniel Kaluuya, Judas and the Black Messiah
2021: Jon Bernthal, King Richard

References

Detroit Film Critics Society Awards
Film awards for supporting actor
Lists of films by award